Prospero Colonna (1452–1523), sometimes referred to as Prosper Colonna, was an Italian condottiero in the service of the Papal States, the Holy Roman Empire, and the Kingdom of Spain during the Italian Wars.

Biography
A member of the ancient noble family of the Colonna, he was born in Civita Lavinia, near Velletri (Lazio), in 1452. He was a cousin of Fabrizio Colonna.

His first notable action as a military leader was in 1484, when he defended the family castle of Paliano against an assault by the rival Orsini and Riario families. After some other battle deeds, Prospero, who had joined Cardinal Giuliano della Rovere's party, was imprisoned in Castel Sant'Angelo (Rome) by Pope Alexander VI. Once freed, he was soon imprisoned again for his allegiance to Charles VIII of France during his invasion of Italy. In the end, the King of France was victorious against the Pope and entered Rome, backed by Prospero and Fabrizio Colonna, in 1495.

During the brief French rule over the Kingdom of Naples, Prospero obtained the duchy of Traetto and the county of Forlì. However, when Charles returned beyond the Alps, Prospero helped King Ferdinand II of Naples to evict the French viceroy from Naples.

The situation changed again with the new French invasion of Louis XII. While the Neapolitan king Frederick IV fled to the island of Ischia, Fabrizio and Prospero Colonna tried to defend the kingdom. They were defeated and imprisoned in the Castel Nuovo of Naples. They were also excommunicated by Alexander VI, who took their castles in the Lazio. Eventually ransomed, both cousins then entered the service of the Spanish general Gonzalo Fernández de Córdoba, viceroy of Naples.

Prospero Colonna had an important role in the Spanish victory at Cerignola (1503), which gave Spain the keys to Naples. After Alexander VI's death, he was also able to take back his territories in the Lazio. He commanded the light cavalry at the Battle of Garigliano.

Prospero then added Itri, Sperlonga, Ceccano, and Sonnino to his fiefs, becoming once again a great feudal lord in southern Italy.  He married Covella di Sanseverino, who gave him an heir, Vespasiano.

In 1515, he was commander of the forces of Pope Leo X in north-western Italy near Villafranc when the army of Francis I, King of France, crossed the Alps preparatory to the Battle of Marignano. In a surprising and humiliating raid, Colonna and his staff were captured by a French cavalry force led by the Chevalier Bayard.  As he was taken, he said of France, "It is a country I have always wanted to visit."

Continuing in the service of the Pope, Colonna gained a decisive victory against France in northern Italy in 1522 (Battle of Bicocca).

His health was declining, however, and he died in 1523 in l'Hôtel Clemenceau at Milan.

References

1452 births
1523 deaths
People from Lanuvio
People excommunicated by the Catholic Church
Prospero
16th-century condottieri
Military leaders of the Italian Wars
15th-century condottieri
Papal States military personnel